Tak and the Guardians of Gross is a platform video game developed by Blitz Games and published by THQ for Wii and PlayStation 2 in 2008. It is the fourth title in the Tak series following Tak: The Great Juju Challenge.

Plot
In the beginning, Tak complains about Jibolba making him clean the Spoiled Shrine. Jeera offers to take the J-Runner, but Tak wants to take a shortcut through the jungle. Despite Keeko's warning, Tak goes anyway. After going through a long trail full of Woodie Tribesmen, Tak finally makes it to the shrine. After fighting his way up, Tak gets to the top of the shrine. Tak decides to lift up a giant gem, and stuff everything below it. However, he cannot support the gem with his Magic, and it falls and breaks. Suddenly, the ground shakes, and these long trails of magic fly out. Suddenly, four gigantic Big Gs appear, and start wreaking havoc on the world.

When Tak goes back to the village, Jibolba tells Tak that whoever did this must see the four Jujus known as the Guardians of Gross. First Tak sees Debris Juju, and after winning a mini-game, Tak gets Lumpy Magic. He then sets out for the first G, Trashthulu. After a long trail, he uses a catapult to launch onto Trashthulu. When he lands, he must use Lumpy Magic to make it to the head of the beast. Once inside, he grabs the essence gem of the beast, and he must jab his staff into the eyes to defeat him. When both eyes are handled, Tak jumps out, and the beast turns to stone and collapses.

After, Tak goes to Icky Juju, and he gets Slime Magic. Tak surfs through a river of slime onto Slopviathan. Now, Tak must get through the slop, and make it to the head of the beast. Once here, he pumps the eyes of Slopviathan with Slime and they explode. He then grabs the essence, and jumps off as Slopviathan turns to stone. Next, he goes to Melty Juju, who gives Tak Cheesy Magic. He then waits, but is eaten by Gorgonzilla. He now goes through his body until he is in the lower jaw of the G. He then hits the hurt teeth of the beast, which makes his top jaw fly open while he cries. Tak then starts beating the uvula of the beast. This makes the essence fly off his forehead, and the beast turns to stone and crumbles.

Finally, Tak heads to Stinky Juju where he gets Stinky Magic. Now, he heads to Stinkolossus by going through another jungle path. Here he makes it to the beast, and he must fight to the top, while fighting three smaller stink beasts. When he makes it to the top, he is floating on platforms, swirling around the  G. He then beats the three smaller beasts again, and then he must shoot the monster's Stink Bombs back at him. This makes him spit out his essence, and Tak escapes.

Now, with all essences, Tak restores the gem. When he is about to put the essences back, Stinky Juju returns to see. Tak trips, and the beasts are free again. When Tak thinks all is lost, Stinly Juju tells Tak there is another way. If he can collect slime from all the Gs, and burp, it will defeat the Gs once and for all. And, after a race in the J-Runner, Tak does just this. Tak celebrates, and the game is over.

Gameplay
The game is a linear platformer with a focus on using a series of parkour moves in order to jump over obstacles and run through walls. A good number of levels are structured around Tak having to find his way across the bodies of each of the Big Gs in a vertical fashion in order to reach their heads and engage in a boss battle. Between most major levels, Tak is challenged to a series of mini-games (which can also be played by two players) by the Juju guardians of the Big Gs in order to receive additional magical powers to help him defeat them, which can then be activated usually in context-sensitive areas during specific levels.

Reception

The game received "mixed or average" reviews on both platforms according to the review aggregation website Metacritic.

References

External links
 
 

Tak and the Power of Juju
Wii games
PlayStation 2 games
2008 video games
THQ games
Video games developed in the United Kingdom
Multiplayer and single-player video games
Blitz Games Studios games
3D platform games